The Dobrin Wind Farm is a proposed wind power project in Dobrin, Dobrich Province, Bulgaria. It will have 100 individual wind turbines with a nominal output of around 2 MW which will deliver up to 200 MW of power, enough to power over 79,800 homes, with a capital investment required of approximately US$180 million.

See also

Kavarna Wind Farm

References

Buildings and structures in Dobrich Province
Proposed wind farms in Bulgaria